Alejandro Hank Amaya (born 2 August 1977, in Tijuana) is a Mexican matador.

Amaya grew up in Tijuana, Baja California, México, and was educated in the United States. In 2006, ESPN did a special story about Amaya, entitled  Haunted By The Horns.

Amaya took his alternativa in Jaén, Spain, on October 18, 2001, at the Feria of San Lucas.  His Padrino was Enrique Ponce. His Testigo was "El Juli", with bulls from the ranch of Jandilla. During his alternativa, Amaya received an 8 cm goring, although he finished the bull and was awarded an ear. He took his confirmación in Plaza México, on November 24, 2002.

References
ESPN "Haunted By The Horns"

External links
Alejandro Amaya at Portal Taurino
Alejandro Amaya at ToroPedia.com

Living people
1977 births
Mexican bullfighters
Sportspeople from Tijuana